The habbān (or hibbān) is a type of bagpipe used in the coastal regions of the Persian Gulf (especially Kuwait). The term ḥabbān (هبان) is one of several Arabic terms for the bagpipes.  The term is drawn from Hanbān (هنبان), the Persian word for "bag.". In Gulf states the term habban refers to the traditional Holi (inhabitants of the eastern coast of the Persian Gulf) bagpipe. The habbān is also called the jirbah.

While the term itself is generic, in Oman the habban is more specifically a variant of the Great Highland bagpipe which has been incorporated into local music.

See also
Ney-anbān
List of bagpipes#Southwest Asia
Music of Kuwait

External links
"The art of the "jirbah" (in Arabic)

References

Bagpipes
Kuwaiti musical instruments
Persian Gulf musical instruments